Erik Reitzel (10 May 1941 – 6 February 2012) was a Danish civil engineer who started work in 1964 and was for many years a professor at the Royal Danish Academy of Fine Arts and at the Technical University of Denmark, in the disciplines of bearing structures and structural design.

His research enabled him to discover the fundamental correlation between fracture, minimal structures and growth. This discovery makes it possible to obtain considerable savings in construction materials. Erik Reitzel is the author of books and articles on the outcomes of his research and on their practical application.

Several prizes have been awarded to Erik Reitzel in Denmark and abroad for his research and work on architectural minimal structures, as well as for interesting and original solutions to major engineering projects. It was for this reason that he was awarded the Légion d’honneur at the request of French President François Mitterrand. In 1988 he was awarded the Nykredit Architecture Prize.

Since 1971, Erik Reitzel, in partnership with his wife Inge Reitzel, has been a consultant engineer.

First prize projects 
With various architects, he has participated in competitions and won several prizes, for example: 
 The New Parliament (Riksdag) in Stockholm, 1972
 Grande Arche in Paris, 1983; originally planned as an International Communications Centre
 The urban plan for Husarviken, in Stockholm, 1988
 The Danish Pavilion at Expo 92 in Seville, 1989
 Copenhagen Business School, Frederiksberg, Denmark
 Västra City in Stockholm, 1997

Realised projects 
He has designed constructions in collaboration with various companies, cf.  for example: 
 Grande Arche in Paris
 The lift tower for Grande Arche
 An exhibition platform in the Louvre, Paris
 The lattice dome for Cambridge Crystallographic Data Centre
 Church at Gammel Holte (Denmark)
 The glass pyramid for the House of Industry in Copenhagen
 A spiral-shaped bridge in the Sophienholm Park, at Kongens Lyngby (Denmark)
 A greenhouse built like a meccano system at Virum (Denmark)
 The quasi crystal structure for the Technical University of Denmark
 The Symbolic Globe at UNESCO, Paris
 The royal bridge on Esrum Lake (Denmark)
 The transport over 2 kilometres of the Terminal VL 39 building from the Kastrup Airport to Maglebylille (Denmark)

Publications 
 The Symbolic Globe UNESCO Publishing, Paris 2006.  and 
 Structural Design of tall Buildings with a minimal Risk of Collapse CIB-CTBUH Proceedings to the international conference on Tall Buildings 2003, Kuala Lumpur, Publication 290, 2003.  
 The Society seen through a Civil Engineer’s Glasses Danish Civil and Structural Science and Engineering. 2003. 
 Fra sæbebobler til store bygninger (from soap bubbles to great buildings) chapter in VIDENSKABERFREMTIDEN, Villum Kann Rasmussen Fonden og Experimentarium 2003.  
 Hur Nya Former Kan Uppstå (on designing new structures) Arkitekttidningen nr. 9, Stockholm 2001
 Les forces dont resultent quelques monuments Parisiens de la Fin du XXe siècle LE POUVOIR ET LA VILLE À L’ÉPOQUE MODERNE ET CONTEMPORAINE, Sorbonne 2001.  
 De la rupture à la structure Colloque franco-danois sur Représentation de l'espace, répartition dans l'espace - sur différentes manières d'habiter, 2000.  
 Grundtræk af Bærende Konstruktioner i Arkitekturen (Bearing structures in Architecture) together with the architect Hans Friis Mathiasen, Kunstakademiets Arkitektskoles Forlag, 1999. 
 Tectonics in Practice Communication at the European conference, Association of Collegiate Schools of Architecture, 1996
 Musikk og Konstruktjoner (Music and Structures) Article in the book: Tversnit av et Øjeblik, Oslo 1992. 
 Rupture - Structure Conférence internationale sur l'Ingénieur et l'Art, Aix-en-Provence, France, 1991
 Konkurrence om Tête Défense, Paris, og projektets videre bearbejdning (the competition on Tête Défense) Arkitekten no 23, 1984
 Le Cube ouvert. Structures and foundations International conference on tall buildings. Singapore, 1984. 
 Spild og ressourcer (waste and resources) The National Museum of Denmark, 1980. 
 Fra brud til form (From Fracture to Form) Polyteknisk Forlag, 1979.  
 Tusindårig tradition (about the church of Gammel Holte) Ingeniøren no 49,1978
 Energi, boliger, byggeri together with the architect Hans Friis Mathiasen, Fremad 1975. 
 Om materialeøkonomiske konstruktioner og brudlinier (minimal structures and fracture lines) Bygningsstatiske meddelelser no 2, 1975
 Materialeøkonomiske Konstruktioner (Minimal Structures), Arkitekten no 21, 1971

Film 
 The Invisible Forces (55 minutes) producer: JJ – Film. Premiere in Paris 2002, arte 2006
 La Sonate de la Rupture (7 minutes) producer: JJ-Film, 2000

References

External links 

 
 http://www.eri.dk
 http://www.unesco.org/visit/uk/notices/reitzel.htm
 https://web.archive.org/web/20110719124706/http://www.jjfilm.dk/produktioner/dokumentar/de_usynlige_kraefter/
 http://kubaba.univ-paris1.fr/auteurs/n_o_p_q_r_s/reitzel.htm

Danish engineers
1941 births
2012 deaths